Cambodia's cadre of diplomatic personnel defected or were decimated during the reign of the Khmer Rouge.  In the 1980s the Soviet Union and Vietnam slowly rebuilt the capacity of the country's foreign ministry, although the country's foreign policy was effectively controlled by the Vietnamese Government.  Since the departure of Vietnamese troops in 1989 and signing of the Paris Peace Agreement in 1991, Cambodia has moved out of its international isolation.

This listing excludes honorary consulates.

Current missions

Africa

Americas

Asia

Europe

Oceania

Multilateral organisations

Gallery

Closed missions

Europe

Asia

Missions to open

Brasilia (Embassy) 

Tel Aviv (Embassy)

Kathmandu (Embassy) 

Pretoria (Embassy)

See also

 Foreign relations of Cambodia
 List of diplomatic missions in Cambodia
 Visa policy of Cambodia
 PRK/SOC

References

 Ministry of Foreign Affairs and International Cooperation

 
Diplomatic missions
Cambodia